Stanley is an American brand of food and beverage containers invented by William Stanley Jr.

History
The Stanley all-steel vacuum flask was invented by William Stanley Jr. in 1913.

Early uses for the Stanley bottle included flying with the pilots on B-17s during World War II, carrying human organs, transporting bull semen by the cattle industry, and accompanying crews on deep sea explorations. More recently the bottle has been used for cooking noodles and hot dogs, transporting temperature-delicate medicines, and carrying coffee or other hot drinks.

Timeline

In 1913 William Stanley Jr. created the Stanley bottle as a result of his work with transformers, during which he discovered that a welding process he was using could be used to insulate a vacuum bottle with steel instead of glass.

By 1915 William Stanley began mass production of the Stanley bottle. He acquired an empty building, renovated and equipped it with machinery for production of insulated jugs, beverage servers, and desk top decanters.

In 1916, William Stanley died at the age of 57. A New York City investment company acquired the operation and hired a mechanical engineer, Harry Badger, as General Manager who continued to invent and develop new products which expanded the product line.

In 1921, Landers, Frary & Clark (L.F&C) of New Britain, Connecticut (a household appliance manufacturer) purchased Stanley Insulating Company and added the Stanley line to their appliance and hardware lines.

In 1933, the entire Stanley operation moved from Great Barrington, Massachusetts to L.F&C's plant in New Britain, Connecticut.  During this time, Harry Badger became Chief Product Research and Manufacturing Engineer and in the following years he continued to develop and add more products to the Stanley line.

In 1949 Harry Badger retired and John Eza became Chief Product Research and Manufacturing Engineer. From 1949 to 1965, fifteen new products were added and Stanley containers were now used by airlines, railroads, ocean lines, hospitals and mass feeding institutions.

In 1953 the Pint Quart and two Quart bottles were modified to utilize common cups, collars, and stoppers.

On March 30, 1961, there was a tender offer to acquire controlling stock of L F & C by J. B. Williams Company, a leading producer of pharmaceuticals. Within six weeks J. B. Williams had ownership of 80% of some 404,000 outstanding shares.

In 1965, Aladdin acquired the Universal Stanley Division of the J. B. Williams Company, which made the Stanley thermos bottle in Nashville, Tennessee. All of Stanley's operations were moved to Nashville and by 1966 the first Aladdin Stanley bottles were shipped. John Eza was hired by Aladdin Industries to set up operations in Nashville, and he remained the chief engineer with the Stanley Bottle Division until his retirement in 1989.

In 1968 the insulated cup and threaded stopper were designed and manufactured to provide a reduction in manufacturing costs and operating equipment.

In 1976, a shorter two-quart Stanley bottle was introduced.  In 1988 the bail handle was replaced by a side handle.  In the mid 1980s a side handle also was introduced in the one-quart bottle.  During this time the 24oz wide mouth bottle with an insulated cup was also produced.

In 2002, Stanley was purchased by Seattle, WA based Pacific Market International (PMI).  Stanley's manufacturing facilities were then moved to China.

See also
 List of bottle types, brands and companies
 Aladdin (food & beverage containers)

References

External links 
 
 Patent referencing William Stanley's Bottle Patent

Bottles
Vacuum flasks
Camping equipment manufacturers
American companies established in 1913
Manufacturing companies established in 1913